The Union of Democrats of Ivory Coast is a political party in Côte d'Ivoire.

In the parliamentary election held on 10 December 2000 and 14 January 2001, the party won 1 out of 225 seats.

Political parties in Ivory Coast
Political parties with year of establishment missing